Roaring Fork Creek is a creek in Wyoming in the United States. The creek feeds several lakes and reservoirs and is a source of water for Lander, Wyoming.

Course
The creek's headwaters are at Leg Lake in the Wind River Range near Roaring Fork Mountain. The creek flows easterly and eventually empties into Roaring Fork Lake. The creek then continues for a short time until it reaches Worthen Meadows Reservoir. It then flows east until its end at the Middle Fork Popo Agie River.

See also
List of rivers of Wyoming

References

Rivers of Wyoming